Nižný Orlík is a village and municipality in Svidník District in the Prešov Region of north-eastern Slovakia.

History
In historical records the village was first mentioned in 1357.

Geography
The municipality lies at an altitude of 256 metres and covers an area of 9.289 km². It has a population of about 260 people.

References

External links
 
 
Nižný Orlík - The Carpathian Connection
https://web.archive.org/web/20100202015957/http://www.statistics.sk/mosmis/eng/run.html
http://www.niznyorlik.eu

Villages and municipalities in Svidník District
Šariš